The ten pence (10p) coin was a subdivision of the Irish pound. It was used in the Republic of Ireland from 1969 to 2002, with its last minting issue in 2000. It replaced the florin coin, of which it shared its design. Two different designs of the coin exist, both featuring a salmon on the reverse. The second was introduced in 1993 and is smaller, due to the reduction of the coin's value by inflation.

It was introduced two years prior to Decimal Day, 15 February 1971, due to its value at a tenth of a pound being the same as the previous florin. It retained the exact design and dimensions (except denomination) of the florin coin, introduced to the Irish Free State in 1928. Some florin coins remained in circulation until 1994, when it was decided to reduce the size of the ten pence coin.

Its size became a problem after inflation reduced the coin's value, and it was last minted in 1986.

This new coin featured a salmon, but moved the location of the denomination as a result of reversing the picture of the salmon. The composition of the ten pence was 75% copper and 25% nickel.

The coin was worth  of an Irish pound. All of the original ten pence coins were withdrawn on 1 June 1994. The smaller version was withdrawn when the euro currency was introduced in 2002.

References

External links

Irish coinage website - catalogue - decimal ten pence
Coinage (Dimensions and Designs) Regulations, 1969
Coinage (Weight and Remedy Allowance of Ten Pence Coin) Order, 1993
Coinage (Dimension of Ten Pence Coin) Regulations, 1993

ten pence (decimal coin)
Ten-cent coins